Aquarian Age is a Japanese collectible trading card game.

Aquarian Age may also refer to:

 Age of Aquarius, an astrological term denoting either the current or forthcoming astrological age
 Aquarian Age: Sign for Evolution a television anime series based on the card game

See also
Aquarian (disambiguation)